The 1906 Connecticut Aggies football team represented Connecticut Agricultural College, now the University of Connecticut, in the 1906 college football season.  The Aggies were led by first year head coach George H. Lamson, and completed the season with a record of 2–4.

Schedule

References

Connecticut
UConn Huskies football seasons
Connecticut Aggies football